Ghana has wetlands and some Ramsar sites. A Ramsar site is a wetland site designated of international importance for migratory animal life, especially birds, under the Ramsar Convention.  These are mainly along the coastal regions with just one in the interior region.

Greater Accra
Densu Delta Ramsar Site
Sakumono Ramsar Site
Songor Ramsar Site

Volta Region
Keta Lagoon

Ashanti Region
Owabi

Central Region
Muni-Pomadze Ramsar Site

See also 
 List of national parks of Ghana

References

 
Ramsar sites